The 1980 Seiko Classic was a women's professional tennis tournament played on hard courts at the Victoria Park Stadium in Hong Kong  and was part of the Colgate Series of the 1980 WTA Tour. It was the inaugural edition of the event and took place from 3 November until 9 November 1980. First-seeded Wendy Turnbull won the singles title.

Finals

Singles
  Wendy Turnbull defeated  Mareen Louie Harper 6–2, 6–0

Doubles
  Wendy Turnbull /  Sharon Walsh defeated  Penny Johnson /  Silvana Urroz, 6–1, 6–2

References

External links
 ITF tournament edition details

Hong Kong Open (tennis)
Hong Kong Open (tennis)
1980 in Hong Kong sport